Oum Hadjer is a small city in Chad, and the capital of Batha Est Department. It straddles the ephemeral Batha River, lies on the main road between Khartoum and N'Djamena, and has a small airport.

Strategically located, it has been contested by government and rebel forces in 1982, 1990, and January 2008.

Oum Hadjer is also the name of the Sub-Prefecture that the city is within. The population of the entire Oum Hadjer Sub-Prefecture is about 14,500.

The town is served by Oum Hadjer Airport.

References

Populated places in Chad
Batha Region